The Interstate Highways in Colorado are the segments of the national Dwight D. Eisenhower System of Interstate and Defense Highways that are owned and maintained by the state of Colorado, totaling about . Colorado has three main highways (two-digit routes), and two auxiliary highways (three-digit routes), totaling five Interstates, all are located within the Denver metropolitan area. The longest Interstate in Colorado is Interstate 70 (I-70), which is  There are also 17 active business routes and seven former business routes, most of them are from I-70. The last segment of Interstate Highway to open up to date was I-76, which was between Pecos Street and I-25 northwest of Denver.

Description
The Colorado Department of Transportation (CDOT) is the agency responsible for maintaining the Colorado State Highway System, which includes the Interstate Highways in Colorado. These highways are built to Interstate Highway standards, which are freeways with speed limits up to 75 miles per hour in rural areas and 65 miles per hour in urban areas, primarily in the Denver and Colorado Springs areas. In very populated areas where the traffic volume is the greatest, the speed limit can drop as low as 55 miles per hour. The numbering scheme used to designate the Interstates was developed by AASHTO, an organization composed of the various state departments of transportation in the United States.

There are also a total of 17 active business routes in the state, 13 of which are business routes of I-70. The longest highway in the state is Interstate 70 which has a span of  that runs west to east across the state, serving Grand Junction, Denver, Aurora, and Limon. All of Colorado's interstates are located in the Denver–Aurora Metropolitan Area while other major cities in Colorado except Boulder and Greeley are only served by the same primary routes that run through the Denver Metro Area.

History

Colorado had already begun planning a modern inter-city route along the Front Range as early as 1944. The first section of freeway was also in 1944 which would later become Interstate 70 that originally terminated near I-25 in Denver before getting extended across the Rocky Mountains along the US 6 and US 40 corridors. The cities of Denver and Pueblo began constructing a multi-lane route that would become Interstate 25. The first segment of freeway was a two mile segment in Denver, which began construction in August of 1948 and was completed two years later. Then, the entire segment of the Valley Highway was completed in 1958, later receiving the Interstate 25 designation. Pueblo would complete the section of freeway in 1959. Interstate 76 is the last primary highway that was completed in 1993, then was later extended to Interstate 70 in Arvada which wasn't completed until 2002. It originally started as Interstate 80S which had two segments in Denver and northeastern Colorado. In 1976, AASHTO renumbered the route to I-76 in accordance with its policy against suffixed routes to eliminate confusion with Interstate 80. 

Two more auxiliary routes were planned in the Denver Metro Area around the same time as the primary routes. Interstate 270 was the first route proposed near Denver. It originally was proposed by CDOT to be designated as Interstate 425 but it was rejected by AASHTO and was renumbered to I-270 on February 26, 1959, about six years before construction began between I-70 and Vasquez Boulevard. It was later extended to I-76 (I-80S) in 1967 and then to I-25 in 1999 to continue along the Denver–Boulder Turnpike. A year prior to I-270 being constructed, Interstate 225 would also begin construction, starting at I-70 and would work its way south through Aurora and into the Denver Tech Center by 1976. A full beltway around Denver was proposed by CDOT as well and was added to the Federal Highway Act of 1968 and was to be Interstate 470. The proposal was rejected by the Colorado Department of Health and then by Colorado Governor Richard Lamm suggesting alternatives to land uses that would be more environmentally friendly. It was later decided that the federal highway funds were to be used to construct a partial beltway in the southwest suburbs that was known as the Centennial Parkway and then receiving the State Highway 470 designation. The beltway was later extended east of I-25 and is now a toll road known as E-470 and then eventually west of I-25 north of Denver, known as Northwest Parkway. The 470 beltway remains as an incomplete beltway with the western portion between Broomfield and Golden missing.

Interstate highways

Business routes

See also

References

External links
The Highways of Colorado by Matthew Salek

 
Lists of roads in Colorado